William Burgit was a member of the Wisconsin State Assembly.

Biography
Burgit was born on December 6, 1818 in Richford, New York. He died on September 23, 1892.

Career
Burgit was first elected to the Assembly in 1869 for the 1870 session. He also served during the 1874 session. Previously Burgit had unsuccessfully run for the Republican nomination for the Assembly in 1860. That year, he ran in the general election as an Independent, also unsuccessfully. Other positions he held include member of the county board of Walworth County, Wisconsin.

References

People from Richford, New York
People from Walworth County, Wisconsin
County supervisors in Wisconsin
Members of the Wisconsin State Assembly
Wisconsin Republicans
Wisconsin Independents
1818 births
1892 deaths
19th-century American politicians